Expresso da Vitória, or in English "Victory Express", is known as one of the best association football squads in the history of CR Vasco da Gama and played between 1944 and 1953. The name would have appeared in a musical show of Rádio Nacional, where a singer, when performing, said that he would dedicate the music to Vasco, called by him "Express Train of Victory", for running over his opponents on the pitch.

This generation of players, was mainly commanded by the Uruguayan coach Ondino Viera and was one of the first Brazilian team to use the 4-2-4 tactical scheme, which strongly influenced Brazilian and Uruguayan football in the 50s. The Vasco squad was also the first Brazilian team (either club or national team) to win an international title outside Brazil, the [[Tournament of South American Champions in 1948. In all, there were eighteen titles in ten years, of which five were Cariocas, three undefeatedly defeated. It formed the basis of the Rio de Janeiro national team that won the Brazilian State Teams Championship in 1946 and 1950, of the Brazilian team, champion of the Copa Rio Branco in 1947 and 1950 and champion of the South American Championship in 1949, in addition to taking Brazil for the first time in history to a final of the 50th World Cup, with eight Vasco players more the coach, Flávio Costa.

History 
In 1942 he assumed the presidency of Vasco Cyro Aranha. At that time, the club lived an uncomfortable five-year fast without any title within the city of Rio de Janeiro. Trying to reverse this situation, Cyro adopted a long-term policy, based on hiring young players. That's how goalkeeper Barbosa, striker Ademir de Menezes, midfielders Jair da Rosa Pinto, Lelé, Isaías, Ely and Djalma and winger Chico arrived. The coach was the Uruguayan Ondino Viera.
.

Victory Express was the unbeaten South American champion in 1948 over Club Atlético River Plate|River Plate, becoming the first champion of the América do Sul.

The first title came in 1944, with the victory in the Lightning Tournament. Later in the same season, the cast would go on to win the Home Tournament and the Municipal Tournament. In Campeonato Carioca the express train reached the last round tied on points with arch-rivals Flamengo. At the end of the decisive game, the red-black player Valido headed the only goal of the game, in a dubious move. The striker would have supported the Vasco defender Argemiro to head. However, the goal was validated by the referee and the Vasco team ended up being runners-up.

1945 was the best year for Expresso in terms of number of titles. The team was two-time champion of the Start and Municipal Tournaments and undefeated champion of Rio de Janeiro, a fact that had not happened for more than two decades. Neste carioca o escrete vascaíno produziu diversas goleadas, como os 5x1 sobre o Bangu e os 9x0 sobre o Bonsucesso, a maior goleada do torneio. O time base era composto por Rodrigues, Augusto e Rafanelli, Berascochea, Eli e Argemiro, Djalma, Ademir de Menezes, Lelé, Isaías e Jair da Rosa Pinto.

In 1946, Vasco lost its main striker: Ademir de Menezes, who went to Fluminense. In addition to him, Uruguayan Ondino Viera left and coach Ernesto dos Santos took over. Even with the important shortage, Expresso still won the Lightning and Municipal Tournaments that year. In this, Barbosa debuted, considered by many the greatest Vasco goalkeeper of all time. In Carioca, however, the team did not go beyond fifth place.

In 1947, coach Flávio Costa, three-time champion in 1942, 1943 and 1944 for Flamengo, took over from Ernesto. That year, the team was four-time champion of the Municipal Tournament, once again undefeated Carioca champion and won the Centenario Cup, beating Combined Sporting, Benfica and Belenenses 4x3 in a friendly at the Estádio Nacional in Lisbon. The highlight of the season was the attack from Vasco, made up of Djalma, Maneca, Friaça, Lelé and Chico. In the Municipal Tournament there were 40 goals in 10 games; in the state championship the team scored 68 times in 20 games. In this one, the cast applied several routs, highlighting the 14–1 over Canto do Rio, the highest score of the professional era of Carioca football.

South American Champions Tournament 
On December 18, 1947, Vasco received the official invitation to compete in the Tournament of South American Champions, in Santiago, organized by the Chilean club Colo-Colo. In addition to Vasco and the organizer, five more clubs took part in the competition: Nacional, Uruguayan champion in 1947; the Municipal, Peruvian vice-champion of the same year; the Litoral, champion of La Paz in 1947; the Ecuadorian Emelec, invited by the host; and River Plate, two-time Argentine champions in 1941/42, champions in 1945 and again in 1947. This was the great favorite of the tournament: exercising wide dominance over Argentine football in the 40's, the River team, nicknamed La Maquina (The Machine), had Alfredo Di Stéfano as its great star, considered the best player in the world at the time, while the Argentine squad was considered the great South American squad. Another club pointed out as a favorite was Nacional; Vasco, on the other hand, did not enjoy such prestige among the international chronicle.

The Cruzmaltinos landed in Santiago on February 8. The Vasco delegation consisted of 26 members under the leadership of Diogo Rangel: the director, Octávio Póvoas; the physician Amílcar Giffoni; the masseuse Mario Américo; cook Laudelino de Oliveira; referee Alberto da Gama Malcher; journalist Ricardo Serran (from the newspaper O Globo), coach Flavio Costa and eighteen players. The base team was formed by: Barbosa, Barcheta, Augusto, Wilson, Rafagnelli, Ely, Danilo, Jorge, Moacir, Djalma, Nestor, Maneca, Ademir, Dimas, Lelé, Friaça, Ismael and Chico.

The debut of Expresso took place on February 14, against Litoral. In the first half, the Vasco team exerted strong pressure on the Peruvians, until Lelé opened the scoring. In the second half, Lelé scored again, opening a 2–0 lead. Soon after, Peruvian Sandoval scored for Litoral. From there, the match became tense, with many rough plays. In the 33rd minute, Ismael exchanged punches with an opponent and was sent off. With one less, Vasco spent the rest of the match defending himself from constant Peruvian attacks. A few minutes from the end, the side Augusto leaves the field due to injury. Despite all the pressure from the coast, the score ended up being a 2–1 victory for Cruzmaltina.

The next game would be against one of the favorites, Nacional. In this match, Vasco showed a great performance, beating the Uruguayan team by 4x1, goals from Ademir, Maneca, Danilo and Friaça. As in the previous game, the refereeing was controversial: the referee ruled out a legitimate own goal by an opposing defender. Still in the match, the cruzmaltino Ademir twisted his ankle. The exam showed a fracture in his right ankle, which took the striker out of the rest of the competition.

Applying routs in great teams of the time, like the 4 x 1 in the Nacional, and 4 x 0 in the Municipal, Vasco was walking to the undefeated title. In the last game, a 0–0 draw with River Plate guaranteed Vasco another title, the club's biggest until winning the Rivadavia Corrêa Meyer Octogonal Tournament in 1953..

In 1949, with the hiring of striker Heleno de Freitas, Vasco scored in Carioca 84 times in 20 games, a record until then. After a comeback over their biggest rival, Flamengo, in which the team lost 2x0 in the first half and turned to 5x2, Vasco won once again an undefeated Carioca title. In the state of the following year, after a bad start, the team rose again, and applying several wins (9x1 in Madureira, 7x0 in Canto do Rio, 7x2 in Bonsucesso and 4x0 in Fluminense), won another title, the penultimate of the Expresso .

Even in 1950, the year of the World Cup, the Brazilian team, which had six Vasco players in its starting lineup in addition to coach Flávio Costa, was considered the favorite to win the unprecedented title of the competition. However, the surprising defeat against Uruguay in the final game took a title taken for granted from the team. In 1951 Vasco toured Uruguay, where he thrashed Peñarol, base of the Uruguayan team, 3x0. In Brazil, he won again against Peñarol and Nacional, both 2–0. These two games were much celebrated by Brazilians, who felt their soul washed from the 1950 defeat.

However, the team already showed signs of fatigue and aging. The club did not go beyond a seventh place in the Rio-São Paulo Tournament and a fifth place in the Carioca of the same year.

The recovery took place in 1952. Despite being discredited by the press, which classified the team as "old" (which, in fact, was not a lie), Expresso had a great campaign and was crowned champion by anticipation, in the penultimate round, by beating Bangu by 2x1.

It was the last breath of glory for that great team. It was necessary to find new people. The old players were then replaced by new values, such as Vavá, Ademir's replacement, who debuted that year.

Honours: 1944-1953

Other Featured Campaigns 

  Copa Rio: 3rd place (1951)
 Torneio Rio-São Paulo: runners up (1950, 1952 e 1953)
  Campeonato Carioca: runners-up (1944 e 1948)
  Torneio Municipal: runners-up (1948)
  Torneio Relâmpago: runners-up (1945)
  Torneio Início: runners-up (1950, 1952 e 1953)

Notable players 

  Ademir de Menezes
  Alfredo II
  Augusto
  Barbosa
  Bellini
  Sebastián Berascochea
  Chico
  Danilo Alvim
  Dimas
  Djalma
  Ely do Amparo
  Friaça
  Heleno de Freitas
  Ipojucan
  Ismael
  Jair Rosa Pinto
  Jorge
  Lelé
  Maneca
  Nestor
  Ramón Rafagnelli
  Sabará
  Tesourinha
  Wilson

References 

Nicknamed groups of sportspeople
CR Vasco da Gama